{{Infobox comics in other media

|code_name = Betsy Braddock
|image     = Psylocke MvC2.png
|caption   = Betsy Braddock as drawn by Capcom artist CRMK for the fighting game Marvel vs. Capcom 2: New Age of Heroes (based on Jim Lee's original redesign from the early 1990s)
|creators  = Chris Claremont Herb Trimpe
|source    = Marvel Comics
|debut     = Captain Britain #8 
|debutmo   = December
|debutyr   = 1976
|novels    = X2
|books     = 
|films     = X-Men: The Last Stand  X-Men: Apocalypse  Dark Phoenix
|tv        = X-Men  Wolverine and the X-Men|plays     =
|music     =
|radio     =
|scores    =
|games     = X-Men: Under Siege|RPG       =
|video     = As a playable character:   X-Men II: The Fall of the Mutants  X-Men: Mutant Apocalypse  X-Men 2: Clone Wars  X-Men: Children of the Atom  Marvel Super Heroes  Marvel vs. Capcom 2: New Age of Heroes  X-Men: Mutant Academy 2  X-Men: Next Dimension  X-Men Legends  Marvel: Ultimate Alliance 2  Marvel Super Hero Squad Online  Marvel: Avengers Alliance   Lego Marvel Super Heroes  Marvel Heroes  Marvel: War of Heroes  Marvel Puzzle Quest  X-Men: Battle of the Atom  Marvel Contest of Champions|subcat    = X-Men
|sortkey   = Psylocke
}}

The Marvel Comics character Betsy Braddock has made many appearances in media other than comic books, including television, films, and action, fighting and role-playing video games. Her usual power-set includes telekinesis as well as mastery of martial arts and swordplay. Psylocke has been voiced by Grey DeLisle, Heather Doerksen, and Tasha Simm in animations, and by Laura Bailey, Kimberly Brooks, Catherine Disher, Melissa Disney, Kim Mai Guest, Erica Lindbeck, Junk Luk, Masasa Moyo, and April Stewart in video games. In the film series, she was portrayed by Meiling Melançon and Olivia Munn.

Film
In the 2003 film X2: X-Men United, her name appears on a list of names Mystique scrolls through on Stryker's computer while looking for Magneto's file. In the film's novelization, Betsy Braddock makes a cameo as one of the mutants affected by Dark Cerebro during a fashion show and wakes up from her coma —induced by Dark Cerebro— when the machine begins affecting humans; she uses her telepathy to sense what is going on.

She also appeared as a minor villainess in the 2006 film X-Men: The Last Stand, portrayed by actress Meiling Melançon. In the film, she fights against the X-Men as a member of The Omegas; she does not demonstrate any psi-power, but uses her shadow teleportation (which can be confused for active camouflage) to appear out of nowhere. Psylocke is killed alongside Arclight and a character based on Quill (named "Kid Omega" in the credits) by Jean Grey's disintegration wave.

According to The Last Stand scriptwriter Zak Penn, the character played by Melançon was not named as Psylocke in the original script. In a Q&A, he claimed, "There was some switching of character names later in production, and I'm not exactly sure how Psylocke got thrown into the mix." Meiling Melançon said, "There was discussion that she was Kwannon or possibly other characters too, but I can't comment on the final choice made. There were certain aspects of her that were true to Psylocke: the red tattoo from Crimson Dawn, and the purple hair - though it was obviously shorter. Outfit-wise - and this is my personal opinion only - if she was standing there in her usual skintight outfit - which I do find sexy and would have been so stoked to wear - it might not have matched the tone or what the other characters were wearing." In the film's DVD audio commentary, the director Brett Ratner confirmed that the character was in fact Psylocke and not Revanche.

Betsy Braddock was included in early drafts of X-Men: Days of Future Past, but did not appear in the final film. Simon Kinberg said: "She’s a fan favourite, and also a favourite of mine. We have a small part that she plays in Last Stand, and we talked about including her in DOFP quite seriously actually. There was a version of the script she was in and we even auditioned some actors in Montreal. But we didn’t feel there was enough of a part she would play in a movie that was already full of many, many mutants."

Olivia Munn portrays Betsy Braddock/ Psylocke in the 2016 film X-Men: Apocalypse, in which she serves as one of Apocalypse's Horsemen, Pestilence. The film's Betsy Braddock has a few spoken lines and no genesis story but did show her notable abilities like projecting a purple psychic blade that she uses in combat. Prior to her recruitment by Apocalypse, Psylocke is an American who works for Caliban in Berlin. She survives the film's final battle and goes off on her own, not joining the X-Men.

Psylocke was not present in the early drafts of Apocalypse, and was a late addition as the Fourth Horseman after writer-producer Simon Kinberg and director Bryan Singer decided she was the most intriguing character to add. They started to browse the Internet "and one of the first things that popped up was a piece of fan art of Olivia as Psylocke." Munn, who impressed Singer with her knowledge of the character, turned down the opportunity to portray Vanessa Carlysle in Deadpool to star as Psylocke, but agreed only after making sure she would have a fight scene in the film. Preparing for the role, where she did most of her action stunts herself, Munn has trained gymnastics, taekwondo (in addition to her own black belt), and sword-fighting six hours every day for three months, and also underwent a special diet to get in shape, losing 12 pounds in process. Some stunts were performed by her double Julia Rekaikyna. Psylocke's provocative latex costume was made by a sex shop in Los Angeles; Munn changed its color from standard film X-Men black to purple and experienced various problems with wearing it. Olivia Munn said she has loved Psylocke since her childhood as "she’s a really, really strong badass female character" and liked "that she was the bad guy that had no problem being the bad guy." Munn said that she would like to do a spin-off about her character and would like to work behind the camera as a producer, possibly alongside Deadpool in an X-Force movie.EXCLUSIVE: Simon Kinberg and Olivia Munn Talk X-Men, New Mutants, and Gambit | Saturn Awards 2016

Television
Betsy Braddock appears in the fourth season of X-Men, voiced by Tasha Simms. This incarnation is able to use her psi-blades as projectiles, incapacitating opponents from a distance and destroying matter. In the episodes "Promise of Apocalypse" and "End and Beginning", she appears to be a lone warrior who practices theft with a cause. She comes into direct conflict with Archangel, and later Sabretooth and Mystique. She refers to her brother Captain Britain as fighting to help mutants. Psylocke also made two non-speaking cameos in the episodes "Repo Man" and "Mojovision".

Betsy Braddock appears in the Wolverine and the X-Men episode "Time Bomb", voiced by Grey DeLisle. This version is amalgamated with Kwannon and British Asian in appearance, though no explanation is given as to the circumstances of her race. She is a telepath, and displays a butterfly-shaped pink energy aura around her face when she uses her psionic abilities. It is hinted that Quicksilver had previously rescued Psylocke from an anti-mutant prison, assumingly for her use of her powers. This is evidenced when while spending time at a restaurant, she uses them to deal with a nearby disturbing ruckus caused by a mother with two complaining sons, being forced to ignore them, when she pleaded to futilely avoid being ticketed by a police officer. Thus, Psylocke makes the officer eat the ticket, and give the youngest son her ticket device and the eldest her hat to make them stop complaining. As such, Quicksilver now wants her to return the favor, and asks her to use her telepathy to suppress Nitro's abilities of self-detonation. The X-Men arrive to stop them and later Psylocke is defeated by Emma Frost.

Betsy Braddock appears in the Wolverine versus Sabretooth motion comics, voiced by Heather Doerksen.

Video games
Action games
Betsy Braddock is a helper non-player character (NPC) in the 1991 action game Wolverine for the Nintendo Entertainment System.
Betsy Braddock appears as a playable character in the 1994 action game X-Men: Mutant Apocalypse for the Super Nintendo Entertainment System. According to Game Players, Psylocke is one of the strongest fighters in the game, who is best at hand to hand-to-fighting (her psychic blade can do serious damage to multiple enemies at once), and makes up in speed for what she lacks in brute strength.
Betsy Braddock appears as a playable character in the 1995 action game X-Men 2: Clone Wars for the Sega Genesis / Mega Drive. She carries a katana and her special attack is her psychic knife. As a nod to her ninja training, she can cling to walls. Psylocke's sword can damage humans and robots, but her psychic blade is useless against robots.
Betsy Braddock was supposed to be one of the four player characters in the canceled Sega action game X-Women, which was planned to be released for the Genesis in 1996.
Betsy Braddock's clones are included among the enemies in the 1998 first-person shooter X-Men: The Ravages of Apocalypse for the PC.
Betsy Braddock as Psylocke appears in the 2013 third-person shooter Deadpool, voiced by Melissa Disney. Despite notably appearing in the trailers and prominently being featured on the game's boxart, she has little in-game presence and only one line of dialogue.
 Betsy Braddock appears in the 2013 action-adventure game Lego Marvel Super Heroes.
 Betsy Braddock as Psylocke appears in the 2019 MOBA game Marvel Super War. Her default skin is a redesigned 90’s Jim Lee, and her alternate skin is ResurrXion. In the game, she is an energy type hero. She attacks the enemy with her psionic attacks, including psychic whip and her signature psi-knife. Her ultimate skill allows her to unleash psychic butterfly, where she will instantly teleport in designated area. She can go back if the ultimate is used again. Her ultimate inflicts silence if it hits an enemy, also marking them with psychic butterfly mark. After a set amount of time, the mark will burst and deal more damage.

Fighting games
 Betsy Braddock appears in mostly every fighting game developed by Capcom:
 Betsy Braddock appears as a playable character in the 1994 arcade, Saturn, PlayStation, and PC 2D fighting game X-Men: Children of the Atom, voiced by Catherine Disher. According to Sega Saturn Magazine, Psylocke is a "fabulous character to control. Her ability to chain attacks is her greatest strength, as is her dashing ability which is only matched by her speed." She was the most popular character in Japan.
 She is the only female character in the 1995 arcade, PlayStation, and Saturn 2D fighting game Marvel Super Heroes (not counting Anita from the Darkstalkers series, a secret character available only in the Japanese version of the game and Marvel vs. Capcom Origins re-release), voiced by Catherine Disher. According to Sega Saturn Magazine, "Psylocke's super-fast and excellent for combos. Perhaps too strong." They opined Psylocke is "so powerful because she can move and attack at lightning speeds. Additionally, her special moves are perfectly tuned for even more combo damage (unlike Spider-Man). Such is her power that Psylocke can chain virtually any move into another. If you're rubbish at the game just choose Psylocke and  randomly smack at buttons - chances are you'll do  quite well combo-wise." Similarly, Saturn Power opined that "Psylocke is a combo machine, has great damage potential, moves lightning fast, and is nearly untouchable if played right. She also has some of the coolest Infinity Combos in the game. All in all an awesome fighter if played right." 
 Betsy Braddock is also available in Marvel vs. Capcom Origins, the HD remake of Marvel Super Heroes released for the PlayStation Network and Xbox Live Arcade in 2012.
 Betsy Braddock makes a cameo appearance in Cammy's ending in the 1996 2D fighting game X-Men vs. Street Fighter and is featured as a special assistance summon character in the 1997 arcade, PlayStation and Dreamcast 2D fighting game Marvel vs. Capcom: Clash of Super Heroes (also included in 2012's Marvel vs. Capcom Origins).
 Betsy Braddock is a playable character in the 2000 multiplatform 2D fighting game Marvel vs. Capcom 2: New Age of Heroes (re-released in 2009), voiced by Catherine Disher. In the 2009 Marvel poll asking who is the better fighter in Marvel vs. Capcom 2, Psylocke got over two-thirds of the votes (68%) against the Street Fighter series icon and the fighting game genre female symbol Chun-Li.
She is an unlockable player character in the 2001 3D fighting game X-Men: Mutant Academy 2 for the PlayStation, voiced by Jane Luk. To access her, one has to first finish the game with Wolverine.
Betsy Braddock is a playable character in the 2002 3D fighting game sequel of Mutant Academy II, X-Men: Next Dimension for the GameCube, PlayStation 2 and Xbox, voiced by Masasa Moyo. She can use her powers to form a "psychic dagger" and relies on her high speed and agility, using quick kick and punch combinations, which take advantage of her psychic knife, and fast evasion moves. Psylocke has two different versions based on different playstyles.
 Psylocke appears as a champion in  Marvel Contest of Champions.
 Captain Britain (Betsy Braddock) appears as a champion in Marvel Contest of Champions.

Role-playing games
Betsy Braddock first appeared in video gaming in the 1990 role-playing video game X-Men II: The Fall of the Mutants for the PC, featured as a player character in her original body.
 Betsy Braddock appears in most games related to X-Men Legends and Marvel: Ultimate Alliance series, excluding X-Men Legends II: Rise of Apocalypse:
 She makes an appearance as the final playable character in the 2004 action role-playing game X-Men Legends for the GameCube, PlayStation 2 and Xbox, again voiced by Masasa Moyo. In the game, Psylocke is rescued by the team after Sentinels attack her during a riot in New York City. She later meets new team member Alison Crestmere (Magma) in the day room and joins the team to help the X-Men save Professor X from Shadow King on the Astral Plane.
 Betsy Braddock makes an appearance in the 2006 action role-playing game Marvel: Ultimate Alliance as a miniboss, voiced by Kim Mai Guest. After being among the many superheroes who tried to stop Doctor Doom, he transformed them into evil versions of themselves after he stole Odin's power and began corrupting the Earth. Dark Psylocke teams up with Dark Cyclops and, when defeated, gives the Crimson Dawn item.
 She is a playable character in the 2009 action role-playing game Marvel: Ultimate Alliance 2 in the Wii, PlayStation 2 and PlayStation Portable versions of the game, voiced by Kimberly Brooks. Psylocke is also available in the Vicarious Visions (Xbox 360 and PlayStation 3, later also PlayStation 4, Xbox One and PC) versions of the game, and originally as a DLC character for the Xbox 360 and PlayStation 3 versions of the game. Her default costume is an updated version of her classic 1990s ninja uniform with the Crimson Dawn mark over her eye. Her alternate costume is the costume she wears in the House of M storyline. Her powerset includes telekinesis as well as mastery of martial arts and swordplay. She fits under several team bonuses, including X-Men, Martial Artists, and Femme Fatale.
 Psylocke returns as a playable character in the 2019 reboot game Marvel Ultimate Alliance 3: The Black Order, voiced by Erica Lindbeck, though whether this version is either Betsy Braddock or Kwannon is never specified.
Psylocke is a playable character in the 2011 PC and Macintosh massively multiplayer online action role-playing game Marvel Super Hero Squad Online, voiced by Laura Bailey. She also has several cards in the in-game card game.
 She is an unlockable character via Season 3 of PvP in the 2012 Facebook game Marvel: Avengers Alliance.
Psylocke was featured in a number of cards in the 2012 (now defunct) game Marvel: War of Heroes.
 Psylocke appears as a playable character in the now-defunct 2013 PC massively multiplayer online action role-playing game Marvel Heroes, voiced by April Stewart. She can be accessed through purchasable Psylocke Hero Pack that includes Psylocke in her Classic (from Uncanny X-Men) and X-Force (Uncanny X-Force) costumes.
Betsy Braddock is playable in 2013's puzzle RPG Marvel Puzzle Quest: Dark Reign.
She is playable in 2014's free-to-play card-based game X-Men: Battle of the Atom Mobile Game.
 Betsy Braddock / Captain Britain appears as playable character in Marvel Future Fight.
 Psylocke appears as a playable character in Marvel Strike Force.

Literature
Betsy essentially serves as the main character in the Chaos Engine trilogy, where a trio of villains- Doctor Doom, Magneto and the Red Skull- acquire a flawed Cosmic Cube and attempt to use it to rewrite reality to fit their desires. Psylocke is part of the reality rewrite in the first book, initially just an aspiring singer dating Warren Worthington, but after she learns the truth and her original memories are partially restored at the end of the first book, she is transported out of reality to the Starlight Citadel in time to avoid being affected by the second reality rewrite. After exploring Magneto's new world for a time, although she fails to stop the Red Skull from acquiring the Cube, Betsy is able to escape the Skull's own reality rewrite with the "local" version of Warren and restore his own memories, allowing her to prevent Doctor Doom taking over the Citadel and then join the assembled X-Men in stopping the Skull's own schemes.

Music
Betsy Braddock's life and powers are heavily referenced in the 2012 song "Butterfly Signature" by Moonthorn.

References

External links
 Betsy Braddock on IMDb
 Official Betsy Braddock forum for Marvel Heroes''

Ninja characters in video games
Science fiction film characters